Werner Emser (11 October 1920 – before 2004) was a German footballer who played for Borussia Neunkirchen, FV Speyer and the Saarland national team as a forward.

References

1920 births
Date of death missing
German footballers
Saar footballers
Saarland international footballers
Borussia Neunkirchen players
FV Speyer players
Association football forwards